Joseph Cameron Alston (December 20, 1926 – April 16, 2008) was an American badminton player who won major titles between 1951 and 1967.

Career 
Despite a career in the Federal Bureau of Investigation which sometimes interfered with his avocation, Alston is the only male player to win each of the sport's three basic events, singles, doubles, and mixed doubles, at both the U.S. National Badminton Championships (closed to foreign competition) and the U.S. Open Badminton Championships (open to foreign competition). He and long-time partner Wynn Rogers were ranked number one nationally in men's doubles for fourteen consecutive years (1951–1964). In 1957 Alston won the Men's Doubles at the prestigious All-England Championships with Malaya's  Johnny Heah and remains the only American to share this title. Noted for his speed and crisp shot-making, Alston was a member of seven consecutive U.S. Thomas Cup (Men's International) teams between 1952 and 1970 and played in four inter-zone Thomas Cup campaigns He was featured on the cover of Sports Illustrated on March 7, 1955. His wife, the former Lois Smedley, was an outstanding badminton competitor in her own right and played on the world champion U.S. Uber Cup (Women's International) team of 1957. Both are members of the U.S. Badminton Hall of Fame, now called the Walk of Fame. One of their sons, Tony Alston, was a leading U.S. player in the 1980s.

Major Achievements

References

American male badminton players
1926 births
2008 deaths
San Diego High School alumni